Corazon "Cora" Nuñez-Malanyaon (born August 22, 1949) is a Filipino politician, lawyer, and accountant serving as the governor of Davao Oriental since June 30, 2022 and previously from 2007 to 2016. She previously served as the representative of Davao Oriental's 1st district from 2001 to 2007, and again from 2016 to 2022. She started her political career as a member of the Davao City Council from 1986 to 1987 and 1988 to 1992.

Early life
Corazon Nuñez grew up in Cateel, Davao province (now part of Davao Oriental) and graduated valedictorian in elementary and high school. She moved to Davao City to study commerce (major in  accountancy, minor in finance and management) at Ateneo de Davao University, where she graduated cum laude. She later earned her Bachelor of Laws at the same university, also graduating cum laude.

Before entering politics, she worked as an accountant and lawyer specializing in corporate law and taxation, and also taught at her alma mater. She married businessman Luis Malanyaon Jr.

Political career
Malanyaon became involved in politics during the final years of Ferdinand Marcos's authoritarian presidency, when she joined the opposition party PDP–Laban and the Davao City-based Yellow Friday movement which supported Corazon Aquino in 1986 snap election. After the 1986 People Power Revolution, Malanyaon was appointed by the revolutionary government as an Officer in Charge (OIC) member of Davao City's Sangguniang Panlungsod (city council) until November 1987. The city council was presided by OIC Vice Mayor Rodrigo Duterte. After the revolutionary government was dissolved, Malanyaon became a duly elected councilor of the 3rd district in the 1988 local elections, where she earned the most votes; she served in that position until 1992.

After nine years outside politics, Malanyaon returned to her hometown of Cateel, Davao Oriental and successfully ran for the House of Representatives seat of the province's 1st district in the 2001 elections. She served for two consecutive terms until 2007 and was a member of the Nationalist People's Coalition (NPC). Although eligible to run for another term in the House, she chose to run for provincial governor in the 2007 elections, where she challenged the incumbent Ma. Elena Palma Gil, who was her relative and former political ally. Running under KAMPI, Malanyaon was elected. In the 2010 elections, she ran under the Nacionalista Party (NP) and won a landslide victory over PMP's Ruben Feliciano; Malanyaon garnered 96.52% of the votes while Feliciano had 3.48%. She was unopposed in the 2013 elections and completed her three consecutive terms in 2016.

In the 2016 elections, Malanyaon endorsed 1st district representative Nelson Dayanghirang as her successor, while she ran for Dayanghirang's position. Malanyaon and Dayanghirang won their respective bids, with Malanyaon returning to the House of Representatives. She was re-elected in 2019, running under the Hugpong ng Pagbabago coalition while remaining a member of NP.

In the 2022 elections, she ran unopposed and was again elected governor, switching offices once again with Dayanghirang.

References 

1949 births
Living people
Women members of the House of Representatives of the Philippines
Members of the House of Representatives of the Philippines from Davao Oriental
Governors of Davao Oriental
People from Davao Oriental
Ateneo de Davao University alumni
Women provincial governors of the Philippines